Nijmegen Tigers was a Dutch ice hockey club based in Nijmegen until 2003, when it was forced into bankruptcy.  It has been succeeded by the Nijmegen Devils.

Sources
nijmegen-legends.com with a history of ice hockey in Nijmegen 

Ice hockey teams in the Netherlands
Sports clubs in Nijmegen
History of Nijmegen